INS Shankul (S47) is a  diesel-electric submarine of the Indian Navy. The submarine was the second to be built in India.

References

Shishumar-class submarines
Attack submarines
Ships built in India
1992 ships
Submarines of India